Firmicus is a lunar impact crater that lies in the eastern part of the Moon's near side, so that from Earth it appears oval in shape due to foreshortening. It is, however, very nearly circular. The crater is located to the west of the Mare Undarum, and northeast of the similar-sized crater Apollonius. To the north of Firmicus are the craters van Albada and Auzout. Attached to its northwest rim is the  Lacus Perseverantiae, a miniature lunar mare.

The crater is named after 4th century Roman astrologer Julius Firmicus Maternus.  The name was formally adopted by the IAU in 1935.

The most notable aspect of Firmicus is the dark, flat floor. It has a similar albedo to the surface of Mare Crisium to the north, making it stand out somewhat from its surroundings. The floor has suffered no significant impacts since it was created, although there are undoubtedly many minor impacts across its surface. The outer rim of Firmicus has undergone some erosion, particularly along the northern rim where it is overlain by a pair of small craterlets.

Satellite craters

By convention these features are identified on lunar maps by placing the letter on the side of the crater midpoint that is closest to Firmicus.

References

External links

 LTO-62C1 Firmicus — L&PI topographic map

Impact craters on the Moon